Starokalmiyarovo (İśke Qälmiär) is a rural locality (a selo) and the administrative centre of Kalmiyarovsky Selsoviet, Tatyshlinsky District, Bashkortostan, Russia. The population was 410 as of 2010. There are 9 streets.

Geography 
Starokalmiyarovo is located 21 km southeast of Verkhniye Tatyshly (the district's administrative centre) by road. Petropavlovka is the nearest rural locality.

References 

Rural localities in Tatyshlinsky District